In C is a musical piece composed by Terry Riley in 1964 for an indefinite number of performers. He suggests "a group of about 35 is desired if possible but smaller or larger groups will work". A series of short melodic fragments, In C is often cited as the first minimalist composition (though La Monte Young's drone compositions preceded it by several years, In C had a greater impact on public consciousness).

The piece was first performed by Steve Reich, Jon Gibson, Pauline Oliveros, Stuart Dempster, Morton Subotnick and others at the San Francisco Tape Music Center. It received its first recorded release in 1968 on CBS Records. Subsequent performances have been recorded many times since.

In 2022, the 1968 LP recording of In C was selected by the Library of Congress for preservation in the United States National Recording Registry as being "culturally, historically, or aesthetically significant.".

Technique 

In C consists of 53 short numbered musical phrases, lasting from half a beat to 32 beats; each phrase may be repeated an arbitrary number of times at the discretion of each musician in the ensemble. Each musician thus has control over which phrase they play, and players are encouraged to play the phrases starting at different times, even if they are playing the same phrase. In this way, although the melodic content of each part is predetermined, In C has elements of aleatoric music to it. The performance directions state that the musical ensemble should try to stay within two to three phrases of each other. The phrases must be played in order, although some may be skipped. As detailed in some editions of the score, it is customary for one musician ("traditionally... a beautiful girl," Riley notes in the score) to play the note C in repeated eighth notes, typically on a piano or pitched-percussion instrument (e.g. marimba). This functions as a metronome and is referred to as "The Pulse". Steve Reich introduced the idea of a rhythmic pulse to Riley, who accepted it, thus radically altering the original composition by Riley which had no pre-determined rhythm.

In C has no set duration; performances can last as little as fifteen minutes or as long as several hours, although Riley indicates "performances normally average between 45 minutes and an hour and a half." The number of performers may also vary between any two performances. The original recording of the piece was created by 11 musicians (although, through overdubbing, several dozen instruments were utilized), while a performance in 2006 at the Walt Disney Concert Hall featured 124 musicians.

The piece begins on a C major chord (patterns one through seven) with a strong emphasis on the mediant E and the entrance of the note F which begins a series of slow progressions to other chords suggesting a few subtle and ambiguous changes of key, the last pattern being an alternation between B and G. Though the polyphonic interplay of the various patterns against each other and themselves at different rhythmic displacements is of primary interest, the piece may be considered heterophonic.

The first UK performance of In C was on 18 May 1968 at Royal Institute Galleries by the Music Now Ensemble directed by Cornelius Cardew as part of a series of four Music Now, Sounds of Discovery Concerts, during May 1968.

Recordings 
The piece has been recorded a number of times:

Impact on other music 

Grand Valley State University New Music Ensemble produced an album of remixed versions of In C. A discussion of the In C remixing project including music played from three of the remixed versions can be heard in Radiolab's podcast on In C from December 14, 2009. The remixers included Jad Abumrad, Mason Bates, Jack Dangers, Dennis DeSantis, R. Luke DuBois, Mikael Karlsson/Rob Stephenson, Zoë Keating, Phil Kline, Kleerup, Glenn Kotche, David Lang, Michael Lowenstern, Paul D. Miller (DJ Spooky), Nico Muhly, Todd Reynolds and Daniel Bernard Roumain (DBR).

References

Further reading
 Carl, Robert. 2009. Terry Riley's in C. Oxford University Press.  
 Reed, S. Alexander. 2011. "In C on Its Own Terms: A Statistical and Historical View". Perspectives of New Music 49, no. 1 (Winter): 47–78. 

Compositions by Terry Riley
Minimalistic compositions
1964 compositions
Process music pieces
Compositions in C major
United States National Recording Registry recordings
United States National Recording Registry albums